Francesco Ruggero (22 November 1891 – 9 June 1966) was an Italian long-distance runner.

Biography
He competed in the marathon at the 1912 Summer Olympics.  Francesco Ruggero lined up at the start of the marathon of the 1912 Summer Olympics on behalf of the Italian colony living in New York City, who paid all the expenses, and then left for the Swedish capital from the United States.

Achievements

See also
Italy at the 1912 Summer Olympics

References

External links
 

1892 births
1966 deaths
Athletes (track and field) at the 1912 Summer Olympics
Italian male long-distance runners
Italian male marathon runners
Olympic athletes of Italy
People from Campobasso
Sportspeople from the Province of Campobasso